The 1986 Tel Aviv Open was a men's tennis tournament played on hard courts that was part of the 1986 Nabisco Grand Prix. It was played at the Israel Tennis Centers in the Tel Aviv District city of Ramat HaSharon, Israel from October 6 through October 13, 1986. Brad Gilbert won the singles title.

Finals

Singles

 Brad Gilbert defeated  Aaron Krickstein 7–5, 6–2
 It was Gilbert's 3rd singles title of the year and the 9th of his career.

Doubles

 John Letts /  Peter Lundgren defeated  Christo Steyn /  Danie Visser 6–3, 3–6, 6–3
 It was Letts' only title of the year and the 1st of his career. It was Lundgren's only title of the year and the 2nd of his career.

References

 
Tel Aviv Open
Tel Aviv Open
Tel Aviv Open